We the People (originally We the People with Gloria Allred, upcoming We the People with Judge Lauren Lake) is an American dramatized court show that originally ran for 1 season, debuting on September 12, 2011, and airing in first-run syndication. The series was originally presented by famed celebrity lawyer/attorney Gloria Allred.

The longtime defunct court show is slated for a fall 2022 series revival with family lawyer and legal analyst Lauren Lake presiding as arbitrator over the series, thus We the People with Judge Lauren Lake. Lake previously presided on the nontraditional courtroom series Lauren Lake's Paternity Court, which ran 7 seasons in first-run syndication.

First version with Gloria Allred (2011-12 season)
Like Entertainment Studios' other court shows, namely America's Court with Judge Ross and Justice for All with Judge Cristina Pérez, and Supreme Justice with Judge Karen the initial version of the series featured actors performing reenactments of real-life court cases, with Allred playing a judge character. Most of the cases were part scripted and part improvised, with audience participation. No money exchanged hands after the "judgment".

We the People With Gloria Allred was renewed for its second and third seasons in March 2012, however, NBC Owned Television Stations did not continue to air the series after its first season.

Worth noting, however, all of the court shows produced by Entertainment Studios were the lowest rated in the entire court show genre at least during the 2012-13 season, only three court programs existent on the network at the time. Of the three, America's Court scored the highest ratings while We the People had scored the lowest.

Revival with Lauren Lake (upcoming 2022)

Byron Allen's Entertainment Studios will revive the program in the fall of 2022, though with family lawyer and legal analyst Lauren Lake as presiding judge. Lake hosted the Daytime Emmy Award winning court show Lauren Lake's Paternity Court for 7 seasons.

In discussing the move, Byron Allen stated, “We at Allen Media Group are beyond elated to add We the People With Judge Lauren Lake to our already stellar portfolio of court shows. Emmy Award-winning Judge Lauren Lake is an outstanding and charismatic television host. We are extremely confident that our newest court series with Judge Lake will be very successful for years to come as she joins our outstanding roster of talent, including Judge Kevin Ross, Judge Mablean Ephriam, Judge."

References

External links
 
 

2010s American legal television series
2011 American television series debuts
First-run syndicated television programs in the United States
English-language television shows
Television series by Entertainment Studios
Court shows